Bagan Pinang is a state constituency in Negeri Sembilan, Malaysia, that has been represented in the Negeri Sembilan State Legislative Assembly.

The state constituency was first contested in 1974 and is mandated to return a single Assemblyman to the Negeri Sembilan State Legislative Assembly under the first-past-the-post voting system. , the State Assemblyman for Bagan Pinang is Mohd Faizal Ramli from the Barisan Nasional (BN).

Definition 
The Bagan Pinang constituency contains the polling districts of Ladang Atherton, Pekan Siliau, Ladang Bradwall, Sua Betong, Sunggala, Kampong Bagan Pinang, Si Rusa and Telok Kemang.

Demographics

Representation history

Election results

References

Negeri Sembilan state constituencies